Leon Jones (born 28 February 1998) is a Scottish-born Hong Kong professional footballer who currently plays as a centre back for Hong Kong Premier League club Eastern.

Collegiate career 
Ahead of the Fall 2017 semester, Jones joined the University of Kentucky Men's Soccer team, the Kentucky Wildcats, on a 4 year scholarship to play college soccer. Given the number 5 jersey, Jones found himself a consistent starter during his first season, uncommon for a freshman. On October 21, 2017, he scored his first goal in a 3-2 loss to Lipscomb. He started and appeared in 17 matches. Although the Wildcats were eliminated in the first round of the 2017 Conference USA Men's Soccer Tournament, Jones was named Conference USA All-Freshman Team and Third Team.

Jones' sophomore season coincided with the program's most successful season in history. In addition to winning the 2018 Conference USA Regular Season Championship, the 2018 Conference USA Men's Soccer Tournament and reaching the Elite Eight of the 2018 NCAA Division I Men's Soccer Tournament, Jones was named to the Third Team All-CUSA. He started all 22 matches, led the team in minutes played (2,006 mins), recorded 3 assists and contributed to all 14 clean sheets held by the Wildcat defense, an NCAA 2018 season record.

Coming into his third season with the Wildcats, Jones suffered an injury and was forced to redshirt his junior year. Despite this, he was named to C-USA Commissioner’s Honor Roll, Fall SEC Academic Honor Roll and was inducted into the Frank G. Ham Society of Character.

Jones was named team captain the following season and made his return to the lineup in a 1-0 loss against Notre Dame. On April 10, 2021, he scored an equalizing goal in the 87th minute of a 2-1 win over Old Dominion. Jones earned All-C-USA first team honors at the culmination of the regular season. Despite having remaining eligibility, Jones departed following the end of the season and ended his collegiate career with 57 appearances and 2 goals.

Between his sophomore and junior seasons, Jones played one season in the USL League Two. During the 2019 USL League Two season, he played with Chicago FC United, where he was named captain and won the 2019 Great Lakes Division title. Jones would go on to be named as one of the Top 10 players from the United Kingdom and made the All-Central Conference Team. He made a total of 9 appearances.

Club career
In August 2021, Jones joined Dunfermline Athletic on a one-year contract. Having made only 2 appearances for the club, Jones left Dunfermline at the end of the season.

On 19 December 2022, Jones joined Eastern. He instantly made impact in Eastern's defence and being highly rated by local media.

International career
Jones represented Scotland up to under-17 level. Born by a Scottish father and a Hong Kong mother, he is also eligible to represent both Hong Kong and China.

On March 20, 2013, Jones was named captain and made his international youth debut in a 2-0 loss to Germany at a U15 International Tournament held in Bruno de Marchi, Italy. Jones was selected as part of the 2013 Sky Sports Victory Shield Scotland Squad, alongside fellow Hearts teammate Sean McKirdy. He would go to captain the side to victory in a 1-0 win over England on November 29, 2013, becoming the first to do so since 1998. During his international youth career, Jones would represent and captain the under-15, under-16 and under-17 national sides, amassing 12 youth caps.

Honors

Scotland U16 
 Sky Sports Victory Shield: 2013

Kentucky Wildcats 

 Conference USA (Regular Season): 2018
 Conference USA Men's Soccer Tournament: 2018

Chicago FC United 

 Great Lakes Division: 2019

Individual 

 Conference USA All-Freshman Team: 2017
 Third Team All-CUSA: 2017, 2018
 First Team All-CUSA: 2021

References

External links
 Kentucky Wildcats bio

1998 births
Living people
Scottish people of Hong Kong descent
Scottish footballers
Hong Kong footballers
Footballers from Glasgow
Association football defenders
Scottish Professional Football League players
Hong Kong Premier League players
Dunfermline Athletic F.C. players
Eastern Sports Club footballers
Kentucky Wildcats men's soccer players
Scottish expatriate footballers
Scottish expatriate sportspeople in the United States
Expatriate soccer players in the United States